Idiostatus aequalis, the uniform shieldback, is a species of shield-backed katydid in the family Tettigoniidae.  It is found in North America.

References

Further reading

 
 
 

Tettigoniinae
Insects described in 1899